Barilium is a genus of iguanodontian dinosaur which was first described as a species of Iguanodon (I. dawsoni) by Richard Lydekker in 1888, the specific epithet honouring the discoverer Charles Dawson. 
 
In 2010 it was reclassified as a separate genus by David Norman. The generic name Barilium is derived from Greek barys, "heavy", and Latin ilium. Later in 2010, Kenneth Carpenter and Yusuke Ishida independently assigned it to the new genus Torilion, which is thus a junior objective synonym of Barilium. It is known from two partial skeletons found near St Leonards-on-Sea in East Sussex, England, from the middle Valanginian-age Lower Cretaceous Wadhurst Clay. Lydekker based the species on the syntype series BMNH R798, 798a, 803-805, 806, 798b, 802, 802a and 799-801. Norman chose NHMUK R 798 and R802, a dorsal vertebra and a left ilium, as the lectotype.

Barilium is separated from Hypselospinus on the basis of vertebral and pelvic characters, size, and build. For example, Barilium was more robust than Hypselospinus, with large Camptosaurus-like vertebrae featuring short neural spines, whereas Hypselospinus is known for its "long, narrow, and steeply inclined neural spines".

References 

Iguanodonts
Valanginian life
Early Cretaceous dinosaurs of Europe
Cretaceous England
Fossils of England
Fossil taxa described in 2010
Taxa named by David B. Norman
Ornithischian genera